Akasic Record is a 2001 album by the Kalahari Surfers, the recording identity of South African musician Warrick Sony. Akashic records are part of a mystical state said to immediately follow accidental death. The album is "a highly sophisticated foray into African-flavoured dubfunk".

Track listing

 "Dig It" 06:52
 "9866" 04:53
 "Kicked By The Ball" 04:47
 "Shikhar Tal" 08:16
 "High Ground" 06:30
 "Gangsta" 05:20
 "Taako" 05:42
 "Devi Dasi" 06:37
 "Noise Rem" 05:39
 "Gethsemane" 06:20
 "Temptation" 07:16	
 "Leka-Leka" 06:44

References

External links
Official site

2002 albums
Kalahari Surfers albums